Eunomia (minor planet designation 15 Eunomia) is a very large asteroid in the inner asteroid belt. It is the largest of the stony (S-type) asteroids, with 3 Juno as a close second. It is quite a massive asteroid, in 6th to 8th place (to within measurement uncertainties). It is the largest Eunomian asteroid, and is estimated to contain 1% of the mass of the asteroid belt.

Eunomia was discovered by Annibale de Gasparis on July 29, 1851, and named after Eunomia, one of the Horae (Hours), a personification of order and law in Greek mythology.

Characteristics
As the largest S-type asteroid (with 3 Juno being a very close second), Eunomia has attracted a moderate amount of scientific attention.

Eunomia appears to be an elongated but fairly regularly shaped body, with what appear to be four sides of differing curvature and noticeably different average compositions. Its elongation led to the suggestion that Eunomia may be a binary object, but this has been refuted. It is a retrograde rotator with its pole pointing towards ecliptic coordinates (β, λ) = (−65°, 2°) with a 10° uncertainty. This gives an axial tilt of about 165°.

Like other true members of the family, its surface is composed of silicates and some nickel-iron, and is quite bright. Calcium-rich pyroxenes and olivine, along with nickel-iron metal, have been detected on Eunomia's surface. Spectroscopic studies suggest that Eunomia has regions with differing compositions: A larger region dominated by olivine, which is pyroxene-poor and metal-rich, and another somewhat smaller region on one hemisphere (the less pointed end) that is noticeably richer in pyroxene, and has a generally basaltic composition.

This composition indicates that the parent body was likely subject to magmatic processes, and became at least partially differentiated under the influence of internal heating in the early period of the Solar System. The range of compositions of the remaining Eunomian asteroids, formed by a collision of the common parent body, is large enough to encompass all the surface variations on Eunomia itself. The majority of smaller Eunomian asteroids are more pyroxene rich than Eunomia's surface, and contain very few metallic (M-type) bodies.

Altogether, these lines of evidence suggest that Eunomia is the central remnant of the parent body of the Eunomia family, which was stripped of most of its crustal material by the disrupting impact, but was perhaps not disrupted itself. However, there is uncertainty over Eunomia's internal structure and relationship to the parent body. Computer simulations of the collision are more consistent with Eunomia being a re-accumulation of most of the fragments of a completely shattered parent body, yet Eunomia's quite high density would indicate that it is not a rubble pile after all. Whatever the case in this respect, it appears that any metallic core region, if present, has not been exposed.

An older explanation of the compositional differences, that Eunomia is a mantle fragment of a far larger parent body (with a bit of crust on one end, and a bit of core on the other), appears to be ruled out by studies of the mass distribution of the entire Eunomia family. These indicate that the largest fragment (that is, Eunomia) has about 70% of the mass of the parent body, which is consistent with Eunomia being a central remnant, with the crust and part of the mantle stripped off.

These indications are also in accord with recent mass determinations which indicate that Eunomia's density is typical of mostly intact stony asteroids, and not the anomalously low "rubble pile" density of ~ that had been reported earlier.

Studies

15 Eunomia was in study of asteroids using the Hubble FGS. Asteroids studied include (63) Ausonia,  (15) Eunomia, (43) Ariadne, (44) Nysa, and (624) Hektor.

Orbit
The orbit of 15 Eunomia places it in a 7:16 mean-motion resonance with the planet Mars. Eunomia is used by the Minor Planet Center to calculate perturbations. The computed Lyapunov time for this asteroid is 25,000 years, indicating that it occupies a chaotic orbit that will change randomly over time because of gravitational perturbations of the planets.

Eunomia has been observed occulting stars three times.  It has a mean opposition magnitude of +8.5, about equal to the mean brightness of Titan, and can reach +7.9 at a near perihelion opposition.

See also 
 Former classification of planets

References

External links 
 shape model deduced from lightcurve, including composition variations across the surface
  (displays Elong from Sun and V mag for 2011)
 
 

Eunomia asteroids
Eunomia
Eunomia
S-type asteroids (Tholen)
S-type asteroids (SMASS)
18510729